The OK Liga is the Spanish rink hockey league.

History
The league was founded in 1969 as División de Honor as an expansion to all the Spanish territory of the Catalan Championship. Until 1971 teams from outside Catalonia did not join the competition.

The league changed its name to OK Liga in 2003 and in 2009 the playoffs for the title, that were established in the 2000–01 season, were abolished while several rules from other sports were approved.

In April 2017, a new name change  for the 2017–18 season was approved and the top tier would be renamed as the OK Liga Oro while the second tier as OK Liga Plata. Also, a new national third tier competition OK Liga Bronce (with four interregional groups) was foreseen, but due to the lack of interested teams, it wasn't created and the third tier remained at regional level.

All titles were won by Catalan teams except the editions achieved by Liceo. Barcelona is the most successful team.

Competition format
The championship is played through 30 matchdays in a round-robin format, a format quite common in other sports, such as football. The top team when finished to play the 30 matchdays is the champion.

Conversely, the last team qualified is relegated to Primera División.

Points are awarded as follows:
3 points for the winner team
1 point if a draw for each team
0 points for loser team

Champions by year

División de Honor

OK Liga

Performance by club

Champions by Autonomous Communities

See also
Copa del Rey de Hockey Patines
Supercopa de España de Hockey Patines
OK Liga Femenina

References

External links
OK Liga website
SoloHockey World Roller Hockey

 
Rink
Spain
Professional sports leagues in Spain